Euperipatoides leuckartii is a species of velvet worm in the family Peripatopsidae. This species is ovoviviparous and has 15 pairs of oncopods (legs). Females of this species range from 5 mm to 40 mm in length, whereas males range from 4 mm to 29 mm. The type locality of this species is Mount Tomah, New South Wales, Australia.

Notes

References

Further reading 
 

Onychophorans of Australasia
Onychophoran species
Animals described in 1871